Alexera barii is a species of beetle in the family Cerambycidae. It was described by Jekel in 1861, originally under the genus Hesycha. It is known from Peru, Brazil, Guyana, French Guiana, and Suriname.

References

Onciderini
Beetles described in 1861